is a Japanese actress, voice actress and narrator from Fukuoka Prefecture, Japan.

She is most known for the roles of Pyonkichi (Dokonjō Gaeru), Nobita's Mama (Doraemon), Kabu (Sally, the Witch 1966), Shippona (Himitsu no Akko-chan 1969), and 001/Ivan Whiskey (Cyborg 009 1979).

Chijimatsu was first affiliated with Aoni Production, then Production Baobab and now 81 Produce.

Filmography

Television animation
Sally, the Witch (1966) (Kabu)
Himitsu no Akko-chan (1969) (Shippona)
Tiger Mask (1969) (Chappy)
Andersen Stories (1971) (Mary)
Sarutobi Ecchan (1971) (Miko)
Calimero (1972) (Deppa)
Gatchaman (1972) (Yamori)
Moomin (1972) (Menmen-kun)
Saban's Adventures of Pinocchio (1972) (Boy)
Umi no Triton (1972) (Moya)
Doraemon (1973) (Sewashi)
Cutey Honey (1973) (Twin Panther 1)
Great Mazinger (1974) (Haruna Shiratori)
Majokko Megu-chan (1974) (Apo Kanzaki)
Space Battleship Yamato (1974) (Shima's mother, Tokugawa's wife)
Time Bokan (1975) (Prince)
Candy Candy (1976) (Jimmy)
Combattler V (1976) (Kosuke Kita)
Gowappā 5 Godam (1976) (Norisuke Kawaguchi)
Yatterman (1977) (Hiyowakamaru)
Cyborg 009 (1979) (001/Ivan Whiskey)
Doraemon (1979) (Tamako Nobi (1st voice))
Astro Boy (1980) (Naoto)
The Littl' Bits (1980) (Napoleon aka "Snagglebit")
Ohayō! Spank (1981) and Spank's other series (Baron)Ginga Hyōryū Vifam (1983) (Jimmy)Soreike! Anpanman (1988) (Mochi Oba-san (1st voice))

Theatrical animationDoraemon: Nobita and the Steel Troops (1986) (Tamako Nobi)

Video games3rd Super Robot Wars Alpha: To the End of the Galaxy'' (2005) (Kosuke Kita)

Awards

References

External links
 

1937 births
Living people
Voice actresses from Fukuoka Prefecture
Japanese video game actresses
Japanese voice actresses
Aoni Production voice actors
Arts Vision voice actors
Production Baobab voice actors
81 Produce voice actors